Below is an incomplete list of diplomats from the United Kingdom to Württemberg, specifically Heads of Missions sent after the creation of the Kingdom of Württemberg in 1806.

Heads of Missions

Envoys Extraordinary to the Dukes of Württemberg
There were no regular diplomatic relations before 1804, but envoys to various German states occasionally visited Stuttgart.
1798: Charles Arbuthnot
1804: John Spencer Smith

No diplomatic relations 1804–1814 due to Napoleonic War

Envoys Extraordinary and Ministers Plenipotentiary
1814–1820: Brook Taylor
1820–1823: Alexander Cockburn
1823–1825: Henry Williams-Wynn
1825–1828: David Erskine, 2nd Baron Erskine
1828–1833: Edward Disbrowe
1833–1835: Lord William Russell
1835–1844: Sir George Shee, Bt
1844–1852: Sir Alexander Malet, Bt
1852–1854: Arthur Magenis
1854–1859: Hon. George Jerningham
1859–1871: George Gordon

Württemberg joined the German Empire in 1871 and the Head of Mission was relegated to Chargé d'affaires

Chargés d'affaires
1871–1872: Robert Morier
1872–?: George Petre

Ministers Resident
1881–1883: Gerard Gould
1883–1900?: Sir Henry Barron, Bt

In 1903, thepost was merged with that of Bavaria

1903–1906: Reginald Tower
1906–1908: Fairfax Cartwright
1909–1910: Ralph Paget
1910–?: Sir Vincent Corbett

References

Wurttemberg
United Kingdom